The JB Institute of Engineering and Technology (JBIET) (autonomous) is a technical institute located in Amdapur X (Cross) Roads, near Chilkur, Hyderabad, India. It has an intake of more than 1050 students.

History 
J. B. Educational Society was formed in 1993 by J. Bhaskar Rao for providing education in English.

J. B. Institute of Engineering and Technology (JBIET), was established by JBES on 27 acres on the main road at Yenkapally village, Vikarabad main road, Moinabad Mandal, Hyderabad–75, with the approval of All India Council for Technical Education and the government of Telangana. The college started in 1998–99 with four branches with an intake of 240 students. The present intake of the society is around 4000 students that comprises the intake of 1050 students from JBIET for seven branches.

Admissions
Students are admitted into the eight branches of engineering under the following categories.
 Foreign students (supernumerary)
 NRI/others
 EAMCET category

The Government of Telangana allows admission of diploma holders into second year under "lateral entry scheme" to the extent of 20% of intake to each of the branches on a supernumerary basis.

Facilities

Microsoft IT Academy

Microsoft Innovation Center
Microsoft Innovation Centers ( MICs ) are technology facilities for collaboration on research, technology or software, involving a combination of government, academic, and industry participants.

Library
The Library and Information Centre has about 206 periodicals and journals (both national and international) and 10 daily newspapers (English and Telugu) are in the Library.

Student Activity Centre (SAC)

The Student Activity Centre housing the student body of JBIET started in 2002.

In February 2022 they, have celebrated 20 Years of SAC "VIMSHATHI" and organised by the SAC members along with SAC Incharge L. Krishna Professor Mining Department along with students T. Vamshi Reddy (Treasurer SAC 2021–2022), Sriman Rao (President 
2021–2022), Vujjini Raghuvardhan (President CESA & civil department coordinator)

Student clubs
The oldest student organizations are the Student Activity Centre, Rotaract Club of JBIET, Music and Fine Arts Club(M.A.F.I.A), Photography Club, Clique ECE, Street Cause, ACM JBIET CSE, Sync Technical Club, The Orators’ Club and newly formed Makers.

The technical student organizations include the Indian Society for Technical Education (ISTE) Students Chapter, SAE JBIET Collegiate Club(SAEJBIET), Association of Computing Machinery (ACM), Computer Society Of India (CSI), Institute of Electrical and Electronics Engineers (IEEE) and The Institution of Engineers (India). JBIET also has units of the National Service Scheme (NSS) functioning in its campus.  Other international organizations such as AIESEC are active in JBIET. National Cadet Corps (NCC) unit is also functioning in JBIET

JBIET has a Linux Users Group called [Jblug] consisting of enthusiasts who promote technology and knowledge sharing with Open Source Technologies.

Extracurricular activities
InXs
The college hosts a yearly two-day fest/annual day called 'INXS' mostly during April or March.

The college organizes a yearly national level technical fest called INFOQUEST which is held in October/November. It is organized under the banner of IEEE, ACM & CSI. The event provides students with resources and contacts needed for the enhancement of their professional development.
Events include hackathons, workshops, guest lectures, group discussions, paper presentations, hardware assembly contest, technical quiz and many more events. Students from all over India participate in the event.

Besides the monthly newsletter, the college has the annual magazine "Beyawned Books". This contains statistics about the college, messages from dignitaries like Governor on occasion of Inxs, and articles from students and faculty. Articles are written in English, Hindi, and Telugu.

Sports
Sports at JBIET are a part of the curriculum and the institute offers facilities for sports and games such as cricket, volleyball, track and field events, etc. Indoor facilities include carroms, chess, table tennis, and badminton. Separate playgrounds for boys and girls are available.

The college has JNT university cricket, volleyball, and athletics teams.

Events
ExtRobos
 Department of Mechanical Engineering
INFOQUEST
 Department of CSE & IT
Clarion in association with Thunrianz
 Department of EEE
BioFusion
 Department of Bio Technology
Eloquence
 Department of ECE- Clique
Progrezion
 Department of ECM-
Aliens Fest
 EngineersHub, a private company independently organizes this Technical Fest popularly known as India's Largest Technology and Career Conference. JBIT was college partner under Makers Club in the third edition of this event held on 6 and 7 October 2018. Makers, JBIT were the coordinators.

Placements
The Training and Placement cell provides personal and career-related support to the students with special emphasis on training the students on employability skills and ultimately provide placement in industries/Organizations by arranging campus recruitment drives. Placement with 3.5 LPA to 5 LPA.

Research and development
The close proximity of the technology and biology/medical faculties helps in the research and development works in new fields that fall in the intersection of biology and engineering streams (biotechnology, genetic engineering, biomedical engineering etc.)

External links
 Official website
 NAAC accredited institution

Engineering colleges in Hyderabad, India
1997 establishments in Andhra Pradesh
Educational institutions established in 1997